Xârâgurè ('Aragure, Haragure) is an Oceanic language of New Caledonia.

External links 
 Paradisec has an open access collection of recordings in Xârâcùù and Xârâgurè made by Claire Moyse-Faurie

References

New Caledonian languages
Languages of New Caledonia
Vulnerable languages